SMA Negeri (SMAN) 19 Bandung, is a public high school located at Dago Pojok Street in Bandung, West Java. The same as any high school in Indonesia, the education period in SMAN 19 Bandung is completed on 3 years, starting from 10th grade to 12th grade. SMAN 19 Bandung is located at Dago Pojok Street. As of 2013, SMAN 19 Bandung has 5 natural science classes and 4 social study classes for the 12th graders and 7 natural science classes and 2 social study classes for the 11th graders.

History
SMA Negeri 19 Bandung was established by The Indonesian Ministry of Culture and Education act number: 0601/01/1985 about the establishment of Senior High School that was ratified at Jakarta on 22 November 1985, signed by Soetanto Wirjoprasonto as General Secretary. With the act signed, SMAN 19 Bandung was recognised as the 1.333th school in Indonesia. As a newly established school, SMAN 19 Bandung doesn't has school facilities such as a school building or other supporting facilities, SMA Negeri 19 Bandung at that time shares building with SMA Negeri 5 Bandung at Jl.Belitung No.5. In school year 1986–1987, SMA Negeri 19 Bandung moved to a new location at Jl.Ir.H.Juanda (Dago Pojok) in Northern Bandung.

Accreditation
Accreditation Score: 93.85
Accreditation Grade: A
Date: 17 Oct 2009

Facilities 
Facilities in SMAN 19 Bandung are as following:
Multimedia Room
Computer laboratory
Basketball and Volley field
Science (biology, physics, chemistry, geography) laboratory
Public facilities
Mosque
Parking lot
Canteen
Hotspot
Library
Coperation
Art and culture room
Extracurricular rooms
Classrooms
10th grade = 13 classes (9 science classes and 4 social study classes)
11th grade = 9 classes (6 science classes and 3 social study classes)
12th grade = 9 classes (7 science classes and 2 social study classes)

Extracurriculars

Obligatory extracurricular 

PRAMUKA

Optional extracurriculars 

 PASKIBRA

 PMR (Teen Red Cross)
 IKREMA 19 (teen mosque bond)
 WIGWAM (mountain climber and jungle adventurer group)
 KOKANG (photography)
 Nineteen English club
 Taekwondo
 Quin in 19 Mading
 Basketball
 Football
 POTRET 19 (19 theatre and cabarets)
 Break dance
 Vocal group
 Percussion
 Zerutoki (Japanese culture club)
 Tarung Derajat
 Karawitan (Sundanese culture club)
 Deutsch club

References

External links
  School website

Schools in Indonesia
Schools in Bandung